The discography of Mark Denis Lizotte (also known as Diesel and Johnny Diesel), an American-born Australian singer-songwriter. He has released fifteen studio albums, as well as two live album and four compilation albums.

He has won five ARIA Music Awards, including three for Best Male Artist in 1993, 1994 and 1995.

Albums

Studio albums

Live albums

Compilation albums

EPs

Singles

Videos / DVDs
Johnny Diesel and the Injectors (1989)
Hepfidelity and More (1993)
The First Fifteen '89–'04 Live (2004)
Diesel + Strings: Live at the Vanguard (2006)
Song Companion (2007)
The 4 Corners Live (2009)

References

External links

 

Discographies of Australian artists
Pop music discographies
Rhythm and blues discographies